Alexandru Andrițoiu (October 8, 1929 in Vașcău, Bihor – October 1, 1996 in Bucharest) was a Romanian poet.

Amongst his notable works are the poem "Ceaușescu - Omul", a romantic poem which is dedicated to Nicolae Ceaușescu the last communist leader of Romania upon his death in 1989.

References

External links
 Biography 
Audio and display of the poem "Ceaușescu - Omul"

1929 births
1996 deaths
People from Vașcău
Romanian male poets
20th-century Romanian poets
20th-century Romanian male writers